Józef Nowara (25 February 1945 – 10 November 1984) was a Polish fencer. He competed in the individual and team sabre events at the 1968, 1972 and 1976 Summer Olympics.

References

1945 births
1984 deaths
Polish male fencers
Olympic fencers of Poland
Fencers at the 1968 Summer Olympics
Fencers at the 1972 Summer Olympics
Fencers at the 1976 Summer Olympics
Sportspeople from Katowice
Polish emigrants to Luxembourg
20th-century Polish people